William Keith Linford Relph (21 November 1928 – 18 January 2023) was a Scotland rugby union international player.

Rugby Union career

Amateur career

Relph played for Stewart's College FP.
Relph was a noted sevens player and won the Melrose Sevens with Stewart's College FP in 1956.
During Relph's time at the club they also won the Langholm Sevens in 1951 and 1957; the Hawick Sevens in 1952 and 1959; the Gala Sevens in 1952; and Jed-Forest Sevens in 1959 and 1960.
He captained Stewart's College FP in the 1957–58 season when they won the Scottish Unofficial Championship.

Provincial career

Relph played for Edinburgh District.

International career

Relph was capped by Scotland to play France in 1955.
He went on to play for Scotland a further three times that same season.

Family

Relph married Lucy Celia Wass (1933–2008) in May 1955, two months after playing for Scotland at Twickenham. Relph and Wass had four children.

References

1928 births
2023 deaths
Rugby union players from Edinburgh
Scottish rugby union players
Scotland international rugby union players
Edinburgh District (rugby union) players
Stewart's College FP players
Rugby union hookers